was a railway station, closed in 13 March 2021, on the Senmō Main Line in Shari, Hokkaido, Japan, operated by Hokkaido Railway Company (JR Hokkaido).

Lines
Minami-Shari Station was served by the Senmō Main Line, and was numbered "B70".

Adjacent stations

History
The station opened on 1 October 1962. With the privatization of Japanese National Railways (JNR) on 1 April 1987, the station came under the control of JR Hokkaido.
The station discontinued in 13 March 2021.

See also
 List of railway stations in Japan

References

External links
 JR Hokkaido Minami-Shari Station information 
JR Hokkaido Minami-Shari Station information as of 2020

Stations of Hokkaido Railway Company
Railway stations in Hokkaido Prefecture
Railway stations in Japan opened in 1962
Railway stations closed in 2021